Aldan Airport  is a civilian airport in Russia located  east of Aldan, Aldansky District in the Sakha Republic of Russia.

References

External links
 Airport Aldan

Airports built in the Soviet Union
Airports in the Sakha Republic